"Boo'd Up" is the debut commercial single by English singer Ella Mai from her third extended play, Ready. Serving as the lead single for the EP, the song peaked at number five on the Billboard Hot 100 in the United States. It was a minor hit in her native UK, peaking at 52 whilst peaking within the top 50 in Australia and Canada. A remix featuring Nicki Minaj and Quavo peaked at number 8 in New Zealand. The song was written by Mai, Joelle James, Dijon "Mustard" McFarlane and Larrance Dopson of 1500 or Nothin', and produced by the latter two. It was nominated for Song of the Year and won Best R&B Song at the 61st Annual Grammy Awards.

Background and release
American songwriter Joelle James first wrote "Boo'd Up" in 2014 originally for herself. She later looked for an artist to give the song to, eventually giving it to Ella Mai after feeling that "synergy of it would be perfect for her."

Mai originally released the song in February 2017 as part of the Ready EP. "Boo'd Up" rose in popularity on social media as well as in nightclubs over the next few months, notably in the Bay Area and later in Dallas, Texas. After Mai served as the opening act on Kehlani's tour, her music reached a bigger audience and the song grew on radio airplay in the spring of 2018. The song became her first top 10 song in the US in the following month, deeming it her "breakthrough hit". Rolling Stone wrote that the single is "one of the biggest singles by a breakout female R&B singer in the past 10 years."

In support of the song and its commercial success, Mai announced a concert tour titled the Boo'd Up Tour in the US during the month of August.

In December 2018, Billboard magazine ranked "Boo'd Up" as the third best song of the year.

Music video
An accompanying music video for the song, directed by Nick Walker, premiered via Mai's Vevo channel on 26 April 2018. It features cameo appearances from singer Khalid, rapper Kamaiyah, and YouTube personality Alissa Ashley. Model Donnell Blaylock Jr. plays Mai's love interest in the video.

As of August 2021, the music video has over 460 million views.

Remixes
Rappers Nicki Minaj,  T-Pain, Fetty Wap, Plies, Fabolous, Dave East, Vado and Young Dro (inayah lamis) released remixes to the song.

Live performances
On 17 November 2018, Mai performed the song on Saturday Night Live, with Jezebel describing Mai as "Pure '90s R&B Heartthrob". It comes on the heels of Ella Mai’s critically acclaimed performance at the BET Awards 2018.

Charts

Weekly charts

Year-end charts

Certifications

|-

Release history

Nicki Minaj and Quavo remix

 
A remix of "Boo'd Up" with rappers Nicki Minaj and Quavo was released 4 July 2018.
 
The remix version of the song features newly added verses and lyrics by both Quavo and Minaj and marks the second collaboration between the two. Its music was also slightly modified with several parts being reorganized and changed. Some of the lyrics in Minaj's verse of the song are: Still a Playboy bunny on Hef, though/So we gotta get the dollar like Creflo/He said that he want respect/I said, "That's dope"/But that goes both ways like DeJ Loaf, uh.

Composition

The music of "Boo'd Up" is mostly kept the same as the original, with the sound being slightly altered and several parts reorganized. The remix also contains a reference to Minaj's 2011 hit, "Super Bass". Migos member Quavo drops an ad-libbed verse of his own. The remix comes to a close with a faux recorded phone conversation between Quavo and Minaj. She asks him to be picked up from somewhere but he's actually already outside.

Track listing

Charts

Certifications

Release history

References

2018 songs
2018 singles
Ella Mai songs
Fetty Wap songs
Interscope Records singles
Nicki Minaj songs
Quavo songs
Songs written by Mustard (record producer)
Song recordings produced by Mustard (record producer)
Songs written by Larrance Dopson
Songs written by Ella Mai
Young Money Entertainment singles